Lepidochrysops ruthica, the Ruth's blue, is a butterfly in the family Lycaenidae. It is found in Zimbabwe (the Nyanga massif). The habitat consists of grassland.

Adults have been recorded on wing from mid-September to October, but they probably occur in all the warmer months.

The larvae are associated with ants of the genus Camponotus.

References

Butterflies described in 1953
Lepidochrysops
Endemic fauna of Zimbabwe
Butterflies of Africa